Donald Eaton Buck (September 26, 1916 – June 3, 2002) was an American field hockey player. He competed in the men's tournament at the 1948 Summer Olympics.

Early life and military service
Buck graduated from Johns Hopkins University, where he was on the football, wrestling and lacrosse teams. He served as an officer in the United States Army Air Forces and deployed overseas in 1944. He deployed to the India-Burma theater of operations and returned in 1945.

References

External links
 
 

1916 births
2002 deaths
American male field hockey players
Olympic field hockey players of the United States
Field hockey players at the 1948 Summer Olympics
Johns Hopkins Blue Jays football players
Johns Hopkins Blue Jays men's lacrosse players
Sportspeople from Hartford, Connecticut
United States Army Air Forces personnel of World War II
United States Army Air Forces officers
Players of American football from Hartford, Connecticut